Sparkling Lake is a lake in Vilas County, Wisconsin.Sparkling Lake is a 157 acre lake located in Vilas County. It has a maximum depth of 60 feet.

See also
List of lakes in Vilas County, Wisconsin

References

Lakes of Wisconsin
Lakes of Vilas County, Wisconsin